In mathematics, p-adic Teichmüller theory describes the "uniformization" of p-adic curves and their moduli, generalizing the usual Teichmüller theory that describes the uniformization of Riemann surfaces and their moduli.

The first problem is to reformulate the Fuchsian uniformization of a complex Riemann surface (an isomorphism from the upper half plane to a universal covering space of the surface) in a way that makes sense for p-adic curves. The existence of a Fuchsian uniformization is equivalent to the existence of a canonical indigenous bundle over the Riemann surface: the unique indigenous bundle that is invariant under complex conjugation and whose monodromy representation is quasi-Fuchsian. For p-adic curves the analogue of complex conjugation is the Frobenius endomorphism, and the analogue of the quasi-Fuchsian condition is an integrality condition on the indigenous line bundle. So p-adic Teichmüller theory, the p-adic analogue the Fuchsian uniformization of Teichmüller theory, is the study of integral Frobenius invariant indigenous bundles.

See also
Inter-universal Teichmüller theory
Anabelian geometry

References

Algebraic geometry
Number theory
p-adic numbers